Glasinfryn is a small village in Gwynedd, Wales. It is situated between the village of Tregarth and the city of Bangor, Gwynedd, and in the community of Pentir. The village is residential in nature but with many outlying farms.

It is noted for having two bridges: one carries the old Bethesda to Bangor railway trackbed on an attractive Victorian architecture viaduct; the other is a concrete flyover built in the 1980s carrying the A55.

"Infryn" means turf, therefore the name of the village means literally "blue/green turf".

References

External links 

www.geograph.co.uk : photos of Glasinfryn and surrounding area

Villages in Gwynedd
Pentir